Héctor Luis Gaitán (born February 9, 1987 in Cruz Alta, Córdoba Province) is an Argentine football defender currently playing for Bolivian side Sport Boys Warnes.

Career 
Gaitán made his debut in first division with Newell's on March 11, 2007, in a 1-0 victory over Argentinos Juniors. By 2008 he had established himself as a regular member of the first team, but mainly coming off the bench. He received his nickname, Patadita (little kick), for his tendency to commit penalty kicks during this season. In 2009, he joined Peruvian side Colegio Nacional Iquitos, and made his debut on February 15, against club Real Mamoré in Bolivia. On May 3, 2009, Gaitán scored his first goal as a refinero in a visit to club San José from Oruro. After his return to Newell's Old Boys in summer 2010 was released and he joined to Torneo Argentino A side Juventud Antoniana. He played only one season for Antoniana and returned in June 2011 to Bolivia and signed for Municipal Real Mamoré.

References

External links
 BDFA profile
 Argentine Primera statistics

1987 births
Living people
Sportspeople from Córdoba Province, Argentina
Argentine footballers
Association football defenders
Oriente Petrolero players
Expatriate footballers in Paraguay
Juventud Antoniana footballers
Argentine Primera División players
Colegio Nacional Iquitos footballers
Expatriate footballers in Bolivia
Newell's Old Boys footballers
Expatriate footballers in Peru
Municipal Real Mamoré players
Argentine expatriate footballers
Nacional Potosí players
Argentine expatriate sportspeople in Bolivia
Sportivo Carapeguá footballers
Argentine expatriate sportspeople in Paraguay
Sport Boys Warnes players